The Industrial and Mining Water Research Unit (abbreviated IMWaRU) is one of several research entities based in the School of Chemical and Metallurgical Engineering at the University of the Witwatersrand, Johannesburg.  It provides research as well as supervision to masters and doctorate students within the University, as well as consulting to industry.

Unit Structure
The unit deals with cross disciplinary water issues relating to industry and mining. As such the group includes experts in chemical engineering, microbiology and other sciences.

The unit includes five NRF rated researchers and over 20 masters and doctoral level postgraduate students in the faculties of engineering and science.

Members
The group currently comprises 7 academics (alphabetically - Mogopoleng (Paul) Chego, Kevin Harding, Michelle Low, Craig Sheridan, Geoffrey Simate, Karl Rumbold and Lizelle van Dyk), as well as several postgraduate students.

Logo

The logo of the Unit is in the shape of a drop of water, with the left half representing the blue of water.

The right half of the drop is modified to show grass and how water is linked to all life.  Underneath the icon are the letters IMWaRU, while to the right, the name "Industrial and Mining Water Research Unit" appears.

Location

The unit is housed in several buildings across the University, most notably in the Richard Ward Building on East campus.  Additionally, some members are located in the Biology Building on East Campus and have access to laboratories in that building.

They also have access to an outdoor facility on West Campus where constructed wetland, and other outdoor, experiments take place.

Research 

The group has a broad range of research publications in the areas as listed below:

 Acid mine drainage (AMD) - methods of reducing, treating and managing AMD.
 Algal Studies - including to clean water, and as a source of biomass for biodiesel
 Biorefineries - the use of biomass for values add product, including obtaining these with dual purpose water treatment.
 Constructed wetlands (CW) - waste water remediation through natural biological processes.
 Ecological Engineering - study of creating and sustaining cohabitation conditions for both humans and their environment.
 Grade Engineering
 Industrial biotechnology - the use of biotechnology in water related applications e.g. for water purification and water reduction.
 Industrial Ecology - the use of sustainability principles in reducing environmental impacts; particularly relating to water.
 Life-cycle assessment (LCA) - quantification and minimisation of liquid/solid/gaseous waste at sites which include food processing, industrial bioprocessing and others.
 Material flow analysis
 Membrane technology
 Nanotechnology
 Ozone - determination of optimal treatment techniques for cooling water purification systems, chemical vs ozone.
 Water footprinting (WF) - quantification and minimisation of water use on, amongst others, mine and paper/pulp sites.
 Wastewater treatment
 and more.

Collaboration
The unit works closely with the Centre in Water and Research Development (CiWaRD), a cross disciplinary water research think tank.

Active collaborations include the Schools of Law, Chemistry, Civil and Mining Engineering and the Global Change Institute at the university, in addition to the Helmholtz Centre for Environmental Research in Leipzig, Germany. They have also collaborated with the Universities of Cape Town, Geneva, Queensland and the Pontifical Catholic University of Chile.

IMWaRU has had several Technology Innovation Agency (TIA) projects run through Wits Enterprise.

The unit exhibited with several other groups at Mine Closure 2014.

Presentations 

Members of the group have had presentations given at: 
South African Institution of Chemical Engineering 2012 (Champagne Sports Resorts, South Africa);
Water Institute of Southern Africa 2012 (Cape Town, South Africa);
International Conference on Energy, Nanotechnology and Environmental Sciences 2013 (Johannesburg, South Africa);
International Conference on Power Science and Engineering 2013 (Paris, France);
Water in Mining 2013 (Brisbane, Australia);
Water in Mining 2014 (Viña del Mar, Chile);
Water Institute of Southern Africa 2014 (Mbombela, South Africa);
International Conference on Acid Rock Drainage 2015 (Santiago, Chile);
25th Annual SETAC European Meeting 2015 (Barcelona, Spain);
 African Utility Week 2015 (Cape Town, South Africa);
 Sustainability Week 2015 (Water Resource Seminar) (Pretoria, South Africa);
 Life Cycle Management 2015 (Bordeaux, France);
 School of Chemical and Metallurgical Engineering 21st Birthday conference;
 Water Institute of Southern Africa 2016 (Durban, South Africa)
 Hydrometallurgy 2016 (Cape Town, South Africa),
 International Conference on Environment, Materials and Green Technology (Sebokeng, South Africa),
 International Conference on Sustainable Materials Processing and Manufacturing (SMPM 2017) (Skukuza, Kruger National Park, South Africa)
 International Conference on Energy, Environment and Climate Change (Pointe aux Piments, Mauritius);
 2nd International Conference on Sustainable Materials Processing and Manufacturing (SMPM 2019) (Sun City (South Africa)) and more.

Awards
 The IMWaRU group was awarded a special presentation award at the GAP Bioscience gala dinner in December 2014 for work on remediating AMD using biological substrates.
 Charne Germuizhuizen received the best mine water presentation award, while  Mogopoleng (Paul) Chego received the 3rd place best technical talk, at the Water Institute of Southern Africa 2016 (WISA2016) conference in May 2016.
 Tamlyn Naidu won the IOM3 2019 "YOUNG PERSONS' WORLD LECTURE COMPETITION"

References

External links 

University of the Witwatersrand
Research institutes in South Africa
Water